Burton Gray "Scutt" Allen (January 7, 1889 – November 17, 1950) was a college football player and dog breeder. He was a prominent guard for coach Mike Donahue's Auburn Tigers football teams of the Alabama Polytechnic Institute from 1908 to 1911. Allen was selected All-Southern in 1910 by Dick Jemison and Bill Cunningham.

References

1889 births
1950 deaths
All-Southern college football players
American football guards
Auburn Tigers football players
People from Demopolis, Alabama